The following lists events that happened during 1890 in New Zealand.

Incumbents

Regal and viceregal
Head of State – Queen Victoria
Governor – The Earl of Onslow

Government and law
The 10th New Zealand Parliament continues.

Speaker of the House – Maurice O'Rorke.
Premier – Harry Atkinson.
Minister of Finance – Harry Atkinson.
Chief Justice – Hon Sir James Prendergast

The number of members of the House of Representatives is cut from 95 to 74. The New Zealand Legislative Council has 39 members.

Parliamentary opposition
Leader of the Opposition – John Ballance (Liberal Party).

Main centre leaders
Mayor of Auckland – John Upton
Mayor of Christchurch – Charles Louisson followed by Samuel Manning
Mayor of Dunedin – John Roberts followed by John Carroll
Mayor of Wellington – Charles Johnston

Events
 The Maritime Strike involves 8000 unionists
 28 October: The first Labour Day is celebrated (but it is not a public holiday).

Sport

Athletics
The first athletics team to compete overseas travels to Sydney.

At the National Championships the 3 miles, Pole vault and Shot put are held for the first time.

National Champions (Men)
100 yards – Jack Hempton (Southland)
250 yards – Jack Hempton (Southland)
440 yards – H. Reeves (Canterbury)
880 yards – J. Grierson (Canterbury)
1 mile – Peter Morrison (South Canterbury)
3 miles – Peter Morrison (South Canterbury)
120 yards hurdles – Harold Batger (Wellington)
Long jump – T. Harman (Canterbury)
High jump – T. McNaught (Otago)
Pole vault – D. Robertson (Canterbury)
Shot put – R. Malcolm (Wellington)

Chess
 National Champion: H. Hookham (his 2nd title)

Horse racing

Harness racing
 The inaugural running of the Auckland Trotting Cup (over 3 miles) is won by Commodore

Thoroughbred racing
 New Zealand Cup – Wolverine
 New Zealand Derby – Medallion
 Auckland Cup – Crackshot
 Wellington Cup – Cynisca

Lawn bowls

National Champions
Singles – G. White (Milton)
Fours – W. Savage, V. Parsons, E. Ashby and B. Hale (skip) (Canterbury)

Polo
The Savile Cup, the premier polo trophy in New Zealand, is held for the first time. It is presented by and named after the aide-de-camp to the Governor of New Zealand, The Earl of Onslow.

Savile Cup winners – Christchurch

Rowing

National Champions (Men)
Single sculls – T. Sullivan (Wellington)
Double sculls – Wellington
Coxless pairs – Wellington
Coxed fours – Wellington

Rugby Union
Provincial club rugby champions include:
see also :Category:Rugby union in New Zealand

Shooting
Ballinger Belt – P. Williams (Wellington Navals)

Swimming
The New Zealand Amateur Swimming Association is formally constituted on 4 January. It is the second national governing body in the world after the A.S.A. of England. A subsequent disagreement between the North and South Island clubs leads to the formation of a rival association in the North Island known as the New Zealand Amateur Swimming Association Registered. The two associations remain apart until uniting on 21 March 1904.

The first national titles are instituted. Each event is held at a separate carnival (this continues until 1905 when a single championships is held for the first time).
In the first year there are 2 separate carnivals for 100 yards and thus 2 different champions.

National champions (Men)
100 yards freestyle (Hamilton) – H. Bailey (Auckland)
100 yards freestyle (Christchurch) – W. Sneddon (Canterbury)
440 yards freestyle – H. Bailey (Auckland)
880 yards freestyle – A. Duthie (Auckland)

Tennis

National champions
Men's singles – M. Fenwicke
Women's singles – E. Gordon
Men's doubles – M. Fenwicke and J. Jarkine
Women's doubles – K. Hitchings and E. Gordon

Organisations
Founding of the Freemasons' Grand Lodge of New Zealand (April)

Births
 2 December: Robert Macalister, Mayor of Wellington.

Deaths
 10 February: Joseph May, politician
 14 April: Allan Kerr Taylor, businessman
 14 July: Hugh Carleton, politician and "first Member of Parliament". 
 17 July: Richard Turnbull, politician
 7 December:  Henry Richmond', Superintendent of Taranaki.

See also
List of years in New Zealand
Timeline of New Zealand history
History of New Zealand
Military history of New Zealand
Timeline of the New Zealand environment
Timeline of New Zealand's links with Antarctica

References
General
 Romanos, J. (2001) New Zealand Sporting Records and Lists.'' Auckland: Hodder Moa Beckett. 
Specific

External links